T. S. Patil was the member of parliament for Akola, Maharashtra, India from 1960 to 1962. He was elected in a bye-election.

References

1900 births
Maharashtra politicians
Indian Hindus
India MPs 1957–1962
Lok Sabha members from Maharashtra
Year of death missing
People from Buldhana district
Indian National Congress politicians from Maharashtra